This is a partial list of molecules that contain 16 carbon atoms.

See also
 Carbon number
 List of compounds with carbon number 15
 List of compounds with carbon number 17

C16